Radim König (born 3 May 1977) is a Czech footballer who played as a midfielder. He made over 150 appearances in the Czech First League between 1994 and 2007. He played for Sardice in the 2009/2010 season, Sigma Olomouc in the 2007/2008 season, and FK Jablonec in the 2001/2002 season.

Career

König started his career with Sigma Olomouc.

References

External links
 
 

1977 births
Living people
Czech footballers
Czech Republic youth international footballers
Czech Republic under-21 international footballers
Czech First League players
SK Sigma Olomouc players
FK Chmel Blšany players
FK Jablonec players
Association football midfielders
Association football forwards